Steven Owusu Kaakyire is a Ghanaian professional footballer who plays as forward for Bechem United. He previously played Berekum Chelsea, Ebusua Dwarfs and Ngezi Platinum Stars of the Zimbabwe Premier Soccer League in 2018.

Career

Early career 
Owusu Kaakyire began his career with Super Vikins FC in Hwereso, a neighboring town to his birthplace, Kubease near Ejisu. He later moved in July 2012 to Ebusua Dwarfs. He played for Berekum Chelsea in the Ghana Premier League in the 2015–16 season. He also played for second-tier side Unity FC where he scored 11 goals to emerge as the top-scorer in Division One League Zone I.

Ngezi Platinum Stars 
Zimbabwe was Owusu's next destination, where he joined Ngezi Platinum Stars on March 3, 2018, for their 2018–19 Zimbabwe Premier Soccer League season.

Bechem United 
In October 2020, Owusu returned to Ghana and joined Ahafo-based team Bechem United, ahead of the 2020–21 season. On 16 November 2020, during his debut for the club, he scored a penalty in the 55th minute to help Bechem earn a draw in a match against Liberty Professionals. Owusu scored in two consecutive matches in December to take his tally to three goals. He scored his second goal by scoring in 46th minute in a 2–1 victory over Karela United on 18 December 2020. The next goal came on 27 December 2020 against Ashanti Gold, where he scored the lone goal to help Bechem win and move into first place after match day 6.

Career statistics

Club

Notes

References

External links
 
 
 Football 365 profile

 

1995 births
Living people
Ghanaian footballers
Association football forwards
Ghana Premier League players
Ghanaian expatriate footballers
Berekum Chelsea F.C. players
Ngezi Platinum F.C. players